1,3-Dichloro-2-nitrobenzene is an organic compound with the formula C6H3Cl2(NO2).  It is one of several isomeric dichloronitrobenzenes.  It is an off-white solid that is soluble in conventional organic solvents.

The compound can be prepared by oxidation of 2,6-dichloroaniline using peroxytrifluoroacetic acid.

References

Nitrobenzenes
Chlorobenzenes